Beatriz Cruz Nazario (born June 15, 1980) is a Puerto Rican female track and field athlete, who competes in the sprints events. She represented her native country at the 2000 Summer Olympics, where she was eliminated in the first round of the women's 4x400 metres relay competition, alongside Militza Castro, Sandra Moya and Maritza Salas. Cruz ran the third leg in the heat 2 race.

Personal bests

Achievements

1: Extra run out of competition.

References

External links

1980 births
Living people
Puerto Rican female sprinters
People from Jayuya, Puerto Rico
Athletes (track and field) at the 2000 Summer Olympics
Olympic track and field athletes of Puerto Rico
Athletes (track and field) at the 2007 Pan American Games
Athletes (track and field) at the 2015 Pan American Games
Pan American Games competitors for Puerto Rico
American female sprinters
Central American and Caribbean Games silver medalists for Puerto Rico
Competitors at the 2002 Central American and Caribbean Games
Competitors at the 2010 Central American and Caribbean Games
Competitors at the 2014 Central American and Caribbean Games
Central American and Caribbean Games medalists in athletics
Olympic female sprinters